Timbalier may refer to:

Places
Timbalier Bay, a bay in Lafourche Parish on the southeast coast of Louisiana in the United States
Timbalier Island, an island in Lafourche Parish off the southeast coast of Louisiana in the United States

Ships
USS Timbalier (AVP-54), a United States Navy seaplane tender in commission from 1946 to 1954